Milan Gajić may refer to:
 Milan Gajić (footballer, born 1986)
Milan Gajić (footballer, born 1996)